Macedoniarch  was a Roman-era title for the president of the Koinon of Macedonians. The title was only given to 11 people.

Office
The Macedoniarch was the president of the Koinon of Macedonians, and sometimes but not always the chief priest of the imperial cult of the Roman Macedonia. The office was also considered an important official of the Synhedrion, a provincial council consisted of municipal aristocracy, Roman citizens, and - in some cases - slaves and freedmen. The Macedoniarch also headed an influential club called the society of Sarapiasts starting from the reign of the Severan dynasty.

History

The earliest record of a Macedoniarch to come from Thessalonike is from 219 AD. The title was only held by 11 people, six of which are believed to be of Roman descent, based upon them having a cognomen. An account, however, cited that epigraphic evidences recorded two Macedoniarchs during the first century AD and 23 the following century.

See also
Politarch

References

Citations

Books

Further reading
The Journal of Roman Studies - Page 43-44
High Priests and Macedoniarchs from Beroea in jstor.org
A companion to the Roman Empire by David Stone Potter Page 232 

Ancient Greek titles
Government of Roman Macedonia